Strawberry Switchblade were a Scottish new wave/pop duo formed in Glasgow in 1981 by Jill Bryson and Rose McDowall, best known for their song "Since Yesterday" from 1985, and their flamboyant clothing with bows and polka-dots.

History

Before being signed
The punk movement expanded rapidly in the United Kingdom in 1976. At the time, Rose McDowall and Jill Bryson were part of the bohemian art scene who adored the New York Dolls and who followed Scottish punk band Nu-Sonics (later Orange Juice) during their career, with McDowall playing and recording with Paisley punk band The Poems.

Bryson studied for four years at the Glasgow School of Art where she achieved a BA honours degree in mixed media.

As friends, McDowall and Bryson socialised in Glasgow pubs, catching many local bands at the time. One of these bands was Orange Juice, fronted by Edwyn Collins. Members of New Pop and Orange Juice had recorded a live version of "Felicity" as a flexi-disc and intended to release it. A fanzine, to be titled Strawberry Switchblade after a James Kirk song, was planned to promote the flexi-disc but never materialised.  The "Felicity" flexi-disc was eventually released in conjunction with the debut Orange Juice single, "Falling and Laughing". McDowall was later given the name by James Kirk.

The band's very first incarnation, an all-female 4 piece, recorded one demo at Glasgow's Hellfire Club and played a handful of gigs. Friends Janis Goodlet and Carole McGowan completed the line up on bass and drums respectively.

Strawberry Switchblade played at a John Peel gig in Scotland, and he invited them to record a session for his BBC Radio 1 show in October 1982. They also recorded a session for David Jensen's Radio 1 show three days later. On both sessions the band were augmented by James Kirk from Orange Juice on bass and Shahid Sarwar from The Recognitions on drums.

Early days making records
The sessions were heard by Bill Drummond (a Scottish musician who went on to form The KLF) and David Balfe, manager and keyboard player with the recently defunct The Teardrop Explodes. They signed the band to their publishing label, Zoo Music (in partnership with Warner Bros Music). David Balfe then went on to become the group's manager.

The band's first single, "Trees and Flowers", was released in July 1983 through 92 Happy Customers, an independent record label run by Will Sergeant from Echo & The Bunnymen, and sold over 10,000 copies. It was featured at number 47 in John Peel's 1983 Festive 50. "Trees and Flowers" was written by Bryson about her anxiety disorder, agoraphobia. It featured Roddy Frame of Aztec Camera on guitar and was produced by Bill Drummond, who would later become known for his work with The KLF.

Drummond, who'd begun to work as A&R for WEA, signed the band to Warner Music Group subsidiary Korova in 1983. They got a full backing band with whom they toured and began recording an album with producer Robin Millar. However, at the record company's behest, they reverted to the duo of Bryson and McDowall and for production duties they hired David Motion, who would soon go on to produce hits for Red Box.

"Since Yesterday"
In late 1984 their second single, "Since Yesterday", was released. Having been given a large marketing push over the festive period, it became a UK top ten hit in early 1985, peaking at number 5, and also met with success in Europe and Japan.

Their cover version of "Sunday Morning" (originally by Velvet Underground) was released as an extra track on the 12" of "Since Yesterday". It was not included on any of the Strawberry Switchblade albums.

The track's opening fanfare came from the fourth movement of Sibelius's Symphony No. 5.

Later records

In March 1985 they released their next single, "Let Her Go".

Following the release of their eponymous album in April, in May 1985 they released a further single, the ballad "Who Knows What Love Is", one of two tracks on the album produced by Phil Thornalley of The Cure.

Their fifth single, an electro-pop cover of Dolly Parton's "Jolene", was issued in September 1985 in the UK and Japan.

Although their commercial success had waned in the UK they remained popular in Japan and two later singles, "Ecstasy (Apple of My Eye)" and "I Can Feel", were only issued in that country. The second of these only featured McDowall as by this time the partnership had irreparably fractured. By early 1986, the group had disbanded.

In December 2005, Warner Bros. Platinum Records released a career retrospective of the band, made up of sixteen different tracks from various recordings on one compact disc.

Solo work
McDowall continued in music, playing with many neofolk bands and performing in and around Glasgow, alongside old and new friends associated with her current representation, Night School Records – such as Michael Kasparis; Proficient cellist Jo Quail and her son, Bobi Lee.

In July 2013, after a break of almost 30 years from music, Bryson returned to songwriting in a new band called The Shapists (named after the fictitious art movement in the film The Rebel), that includes her daughter Jessie Frost.

Band members
Former members
Rose McDowall – lead vocals, rhythm guitar (1981–1986)
Jill Bryson – backing vocals, lead guitar (1981–1986)
Janis Goodlet – bass (1981–1982)
Carole McGowan – drums (1981–1982)

Discography 

The discography of Strawberry Switchblade consists of one studio album, two compilation albums, one extended play, seven singles, thirteen b-sides and four music videos.

Studio albums

Compilation albums

Extended plays
 1982 4-Piece Demo (2017), Night School

Singles

B-sides
 "Go Away" (1983) (B-side of "Trees and Flowers")
 "Trees and Flowers (Just Music)" (1983) (B-side of "Trees and Flowers")
 "By the Sea" (1984) (B-side of "Since Yesterday")
 "Sunday Morning" (1984) (B-side of "Since Yesterday")
 "Beautiful End" (1985) (B-side of "Let Her Go")
 "Michael Who Walks by Night" (1985) (B-side of "Let Her Go")
 "Poor Hearts" (1985) (B-side of "Who Knows What Love Is?")
 "Let Her Go (Kitchensynch Mix-Up)" (1985) (B-side of "Who Knows What Love Is?")
 "Being Cold" (1985) (B-side of "Jolene" and "Ecstasy (Apple of My Eye)")
 "Black Taxi" (1985) (B-side of "Jolene")
 "Jolene (Extended Mix)" (1985) (B-side of "Jolene")
 "Since Yesterday (Extended Mix)" (1986) (B-side of "I Can Feel")

Music videos

Compilation appearances
 "Dark 7" on Scared to Get Happy: A Story of Indie-Pop 1980–1989 (2013), Cherry Red

References

Scottish girl groups
Musical groups established in 1981
Musical groups disestablished in 1986
Musical groups from Glasgow
Scottish musical duos
Scottish new wave musical groups
Scottish pop music groups
British new wave girl groups
Female musical duos
New wave duos
1981 establishments in Scotland
1986 disestablishments in the United Kingdom
Warner Music Group artists